Noble Township is one of fourteen townships in Shelby County, Indiana. As of the 2010 census, its population was 1,486 and it contained 668 housing units.

History
Noble Township was established before 1840.

Cooper-Alley House and George Rudicel Polygonal Barn are listed on the National Register of Historic Places.

Geography

Cities and towns
 St. Paul (partial)

Unincorporated towns
 Geneva
 Morven
 Pleasure Valley
 Sleepy Hollow

References

External links
 Indiana Township Association
 United Township Association of Indiana

Townships in Shelby County, Indiana
Townships in Indiana